Balal (also Romanized as Balāl; also known as Deh-e Balāl) is a village in Jahanabad Rural District, in the Central District of Hirmand County, Sistan and Baluchestan Province, Iran. At the 2006 census, its population was 50, in 11 families.

References 

Populated places in Hirmand County